Aspinothoracidi is a clade of placoderms, extinct armored fish most diverse during the Devonian. The gigantic apex predator Dinichthys, is the best-known member of this group. Many other genera, such as the infamous Dunkleosteus, were previously thought to be close relatives of Dinichthys and were grouped together in the family Dinichthyidae, though more recent studies have restricted that family to only its type species.

Phylogeny
Eubrachythoraci is divided into the clades Coccosteomorphi and Pachyosteomorphi, the latter of which can be further sub-divided into Aspinothoracidi and Dunkleosteoidea, as shown in the cladogram below:

References 

Arthrodires